Selvigny is a former commune in the Nord department in northern France, merged in 1972 with Walincourt to create Walincourt-Selvigny. Its population is 377 (2019).

Heraldry

See also
Communes of the Nord department

References

Former communes of Nord (French department)